Manuel 'Manolo' Herrero Galaso (born 28 June 1970) is a Spanish former footballer who played as a midfielder, and is a current manager.

His career was closely associated to Jaén, as both a player and a coach.

Playing career
Born in Andújar, Jaén, Andalusia, Herrero made his senior debut with local amateurs Iliturgi CF before joining Real Jaén in 1991. He left the latter three years later and moved straight to La Liga with Real Valladolid, but totalled only 245 minutes of action in his only season, also being loaned to Córdoba CF during his tenure.

Herrero competed solely in Segunda División B in the following years, representing Jaén, Málaga CF, Granada CF and Gimnàstic de Tarragona. He achieved promotion with the Catalans in 2001, but was relegated the following year.

Herrero returned to Jaén for the second time in the 2003 off-season, retiring at the end of the 2005–06 campaign after a further three years in the third level, aged 36. He totalled 272 matches for his main club in seven years, 253 in the league, 16 in the Copa del Rey and three in the Copa Federación de España, scoring 40 goals in all competitions.

Coaching career
After retiring, Herrero was an assistant manager of Real Jaén B, being promoted to head coach in the summer of 2009 as they competed in the regional championships. He left at the end of the season, and joined the first team.

In February 2011, after working with the club as a match delegate, Herrero obtained a professional license, being named Jaén's manager after replacing fired José Miguel Campos. In 2012–13, he led the side to the first place in the regular season and the subsequent playoff promotion, which meant a return to Segunda División after an 11-year absence.

On 4 July 2013, Herrero signed a new contract with the Whites. He left the club the following year, after his side's relegation.

Herrero signed with Hércules CF in the third tier on 26 January 2015, taking over from the sacked Pacheta. He was dismissed roughly one year later, following a 0–2 home loss against CD Alcoyano.

On 14 June 2016, Herrero was appointed SD Ponferradina manager, lasting only four months in charge. The following 20 May, he signed with UD Melilla.

Herrero took over Real Murcia on 11 June 2018. Having won eight of 26 games, he was relieved of his duties the following 27 February.

On 6 November 2019, Herrero returned to Melilla, 13th in their third-division group.

Managerial statistics

Honours

Manager
Jaén
Segunda División B: 2012–13

References

External links

1970 births
Living people
People from Andújar
Sportspeople from the Province of Jaén (Spain)
Spanish footballers
Footballers from Andalusia
Association football midfielders
La Liga players
Segunda División players
Segunda División B players
Real Jaén footballers
Real Valladolid players
Córdoba CF players
Málaga CF players
Granada CF footballers
Gimnàstic de Tarragona footballers
Spanish football managers
Segunda División managers
Segunda División B managers
Real Jaén managers
Hércules CF managers
SD Ponferradina managers
UD Melilla managers
Real Murcia managers